Neptis nashona, the less rich sailer, is a nymphalid butterfly found in Asia. The species was first described by Charles Swinhoe in 1896.

Subspecies
Neptis nashona nashona (Sikkim, Assam, northern Myanmar)
Neptis nashona aagaardi Riley, 1932 (northern Thailand)
Neptis nashona chapa Eliot, 1969 (Cochin China)
Neptis nashona patricia Oberthür, 1906

References

nashona
Butterflies of Indochina
Butterflies described in 1896